Jemba Busungwe (died 1584) was Kabaka (king) of the Kingdom of Buganda between 1564 and 1584. He was the 10th Kabaka of Buganda.

Claim to the throne
He was the son of Kabaka Nakibinge Kagali, Kabaka of Buganda, between 1524 and 1554. His mother was Najjemba, the 2nd wife of his father. He ascended to the throne upon the death of his elder half-brother. He established his capital at Bubango Hill, in what became Busiro Country, in modern-day Wakiso District.

Married life
He had three wives:

 Nabbanja, daughter of Kayiira, of the Mbogo clan
 Nakkazi, daughter of Gabunga, of the Mamba clan
 Nanfuka, daughter of Kasujja, of the Ngeye clan

Issue
He fathered four sons:

 Prince (Omulangira) Kawaali, whose mother was Nabbanja
 Prince (Omulangira) Lulume, whose mother was Nabbanja
 Prince (Omulangira) Gogombe, whose mother was Nakkazi
 Prince (Omulangira) Zigulu, whose mother was Nanfuka

The final years
He died at the Bagambamunyoro Palace, Bubango, Busiro County, in 1584. He was buried at Gombe, in Bulemeezi County. Other credible sources place his burial place at Bubango, Busiro.

See also
 Kabaka of Buganda

Succession table

References

External links
List of the Kings of Buganda

Kabakas of Buganda
16th-century African people